Justice for the Judge: An Autobiography is an auto-biography of Ranjan Gogoi, the 46th Chief Justice of India of the Supreme Court of India, and a Member of Rajya Sabha. The book has been published by Rupa Publications, India and came out on 8 December 2021. The cover was released on the day before the release of the book, which was released at an event in New Delhi attended by his colleague and successor Chief Justice Sharad Arvind Bobde.

References

External links 
 

Indian autobiographies
2021 non-fiction books
Rupa Publications books